Clare Walker Leslie (born March 1, 1947) is a naturalist, artist, and writer. She is best known for her nature journals. She advocates their use by the wider public.

Early life and education
She grew up outside of Philadelphia. She has a degree in art history from Carleton College.

Career
She has taught at Williams College, MIT, Harvard’s Landscape Design Program, College of the Atlantic, Antioch New England, and numerous Audubon centers. She is a member of the National Guild of Science Illustrators and the international Artists For Nature Foundation.

Personal life
She lives with her husband and family in Cambridge, Massachusetts, and in Granville, Vermont.

Books
A Year in Nature: A Memoir of Solace Green Writers Press of Brattleboro
The Curious Nature Guide, 2015
The Nature Connection Storey Publishing, 2010
Keeping a Nature Journal: Discover a Whole New Way of Seeing the World Around You
Drawn to Nature: From the Journals of Clare Walker Leslie 2005
Nature All Year Long
Nature Drawing: A Tool for Learning
The Art of Field Sketching
The Ancient Celtic Festivals and How We Celebrate Them Today
A Naturalist's Sketchbook: Pages from the Seasons of the Year 1987
Notes from a Naturalist's Sketchbook 1981

References

External links
 Clare Walker Leslie

Living people
American nature writers
Carleton College alumni
1947 births